This is a list of destinations currently served by Chinese low-cost airline Spring Airlines.

List

References

Spring Airlines